Pakistan competed at the 2022 World Athletics Championships in Eugene, United States, from 15 to 24 July 2022. It had entered 1 athlete.

Results

Men

 Field events

References

Nations at the 2022 World Athletics Championships
World Athletics Championships
2022